Jocara oediperalis is a species of snout moth in the genus Jocara. It is found in Panama and South America.

References

Moths described in 1906
Jocara